Parnham is a place in Dorset, England. It is also a surname and may refer to:

Craig Parnham (born 1973), English field hockey player and coach
Douglas Parnham (born 1951), British sprint canoer
Rube Parnham (1894–1963), American baseball player

See also
Farnham (surname)